Ole Laurentius Frøvig (July 24, 1877 – August 10, 1951) was a Norwegian painter. He painted pictures in the naturalist style, often using themes from his home town of Haugesund. The Haugesund Art Gallery contains many paintings by Frøvig.

Frøvig was born in humble circumstances in Haugesund and grew up living on Strandgaten. His father, Jacob Danielsen Frøvig (1834–1894), was a brazier, a craftsman that makes ornaments from bronze and brass. His mother was Berthe Molene Apeland (1835-1919). Frøvig's parents were deeply religious, and this is also reflected in his paintings. Frøvig grew up together with an elder brother and two elder sisters. His brother  Daniel Andreas Frøvig ( 1870-1954) was a was parish priest who later became a professor of theology at the University of Oslo.

He  received an artist education in Christiania  at the Norwegian National Academy of Craft and Art Industry  under Oscar Arnold Wergeland in 1898. He was then a student at the studio of  Peder Severin Krøyer  in Copenhagen. In 1904, Frøvig made his debut at the Høstutstillingen in Christiania. Frøvig was one of the founders of Haugesund Kunstforening in 1913. He was chairman of the association in 1927-38. Frøvig  painted the altarpieces in the churches at Torvastad (1914), Bokn (1925) and in Tysvær (1938).

References

1877 births
1951 deaths
People from Haugesund
19th-century Norwegian painters
20th-century Norwegian painters
Norwegian male painters
19th-century Norwegian male artists
20th-century Norwegian male artists